Gornji Ribnik is a village in the municipality of Ribnik, Republika Srpska, Bosnia and Herzegovina. The river Ribnik runs through the settlement.

References

Populated places in Ribnik
Villages in Republika Srpska